Gertraut Munk (1590-1625), was an Austrian businessperson.

She was the Court Jew of Ferdinand II, Holy Roman Emperor.

References

1590 births
1625 deaths
17th-century businesswomen
17th-century businesspeople
17th-century Austrian women
17th-century Jews
Court Jews
Women bankers
Ferdinand II, Holy Roman Emperor